Buddy Rich – Live at the 1982 Montreal Jazz Festival is a video (DVD) and audio (CD) recording made of jazz drummer Buddy Rich and the Buddy Rich Big Band at the 1982 Montreal Jazz Festival.

Track listing
"Hookin It"  
"Brush Strokes" 
"If They Could See Me Now" 
"Good News" 
"West Side Story Medley" 
"Carioca" 
"Time Check" 
"Green Dolphin Street" (Bonus Clip on DVD only)

Personnel
Buddy Rich – drums
Mike Boone – bass guitar
Lee Musiker – piano
Trumpets 
Dave Stahl 
Doug Clark 
Chris Pasin 
Jay Coble
Trombones 
Peter Enblom 
Ken Crane 
Pete Beltran 
Saxophones 
Steve Marcus 
Mike Smith 
Andy Fusco 
Walt Weiskopf 
Keith Bishop

References

Hudson Music HL 320423

External links
Hudson Music

1982 albums
Buddy Rich albums
Concert films